Reichel Lake is a lake in the U.S. state of Washington.

Reichel Lake was named after Louis Reighel, a pioneer who arrived into the area in the 1880s.

References

Lakes of Thurston County, Washington